Pseudomasoreus is a genus of beetles in the family Carabidae, containing the following species:

 Pseudomasoreus balli Basilewsky, 1984 
 Pseudomasoreus basilewskyi (Ball & Hilchie, 1983) 
 Pseudomasoreus canigoulensis Fairmaire & Laboulbene, 1854 
 Pseudomasoreus capicola Basilewsky, 1954 
 Pseudomasoreus catalai Jeannel, 1949  
 Pseudomasoreus decorsei Jeannel, 1941 
 Pseudomasoreus descarpentriesi Mateu, 1980 
 Pseudomasoreus deuvei Casale, 1998 
 Pseudomasoreus hereai Mateu, 1980 
 Pseudomasoreus inopinatus Jeannel, 1941 
 Pseudomasoreus jocqueli Basilewsky, 1984 
 Pseudomasoreus kilimanus Basilewsky, 1962 
 Pseudomasoreus madecassus Mateu, 1970 
 Pseudomasoreus mantasoanus Mateu, 1980 
 Pseudomasoreus mateui (Ball & Hilchie, 1983) 
 Pseudomasoreus meridionalis Jeannel, 1955 
 Pseudomasoreus pauliani Basilewsky, 1953  
 Pseudomasoreus reticulatus (Ball & Hilchie, 1983) 
 Pseudomasoreus thoracicus (Ball & Hilchie, 1983) 
 Pseudomasoreus uluguruanus Basilewsky, 1962

References

Lebiinae